Love Leadership: The New Way to Lead in a Fear-Based World is an educational book by John Hope Bryant, published in August 2009.

See also
Operation HOPE, Inc.
How the Poor Can Save Capitalism

External links
Love & Leadership Go Hand In Hand
On Leadership: The Federal Coach Operation HOPE's Bryant
The God Crisis
Reset: Jobs and What We Need to Do Now
Stop Trying To Get Rich!
Leading With Love: Giving to Your People Gets Results
Why Change and Love Leadership are First Cousins

References

2009 non-fiction books